Karásek (feminine Karásková) is a Czech surname. Notable people include:

 Cyprián Karásek Lvovický, Czech astronomer
 David Karasek (born 1987), Swiss swimmer
 Franz Karasek (1924–1986), Austrian politician
 Hellmuth Karasek (1934–2015), German novelist, journalist and literary critic
 Jiří Karásek ze Lvovic, Czech poet

Czech-language surnames